For scenic gravity railroads, an early terminology, see roller coasters

A scenic railroad or scenic railway is a train service operating leisure tours of sights such as mountain scenery and foliage tours.

Scenic railroads

United States
Scenic railroads in the United States include:
Adirondack Scenic Railroad
Boone and Scenic Valley Railroad
Cass Scenic Railroad at Cass Scenic Railroad State Park
Catskill Mountain Railroad
Cuyahoga Valley Scenic Railroad
Cumbres and Toltec Scenic Railroad
Conway Scenic Railroad
Kettle Moraine Scenic Railroad (defunct)
Mount Hood Railroad
Mount Rainier Scenic Railroad
Newport Scenic Railway
Oregon Coast Scenic Railroad
Potomac Eagle Scenic Railroad
Rio Grande Scenic Railroad
Stone Mountain Scenic Railroad
Western Maryland Scenic Railroad
Winnipesaukee Scenic Railroad

Great Britain
According to the Merriam Webster Dictionary, scenic railways in Britain are miniature railroads  traveling by artificial scenery for example at amusement parks.

See also
Heritage railway
List of heritage railroads in the United States
List of railway museums

References

Scenic